The Yantic River forms at the confluence of the Deep River, Sherman Brook, and Exeter Brook about  east of Colchester, Connecticut. The Yantic River is a popular whitewater paddling destination with a mix of quickwater and Class I-III whitewater. It passes through the towns of Lebanon, Bozrah, and Norwich. The USS Yantic was named after the river.

Crossings

See also

List of rivers of Connecticut

References

External links
 Connecticut Explorer's Guide Online paddling map of the Yantic River

Tourist attractions in New London County, Connecticut
Rivers of New London County, Connecticut
Rivers of Connecticut
Tributaries of the Thames River (Connecticut)
Connecticut placenames of Native American origin